Cypselurus is a genus of flying fish in the family Exocoetidae.

Species
Currently, there are twelve recognized species in this genus:
 Cypselurus angusticeps (Nichols & Breder, 1935) — narrowhead flying fish
 Cypselurus callopterus (Günther, 1866) — ornamented flying fish, beautyfin flying fish
 Cypselurus comatus (Mitchill, 1815) — clearwing flying fish
 Cypselurus hexazona (Bleeker, 1853) — darkbar flying fish
 Cypselurus hiraii (T. Abe, 1953)
 Cypselurus longibarbus (Parin, 1861)
 Cypselurus naresii (Günther, 1889) — Pharao flying fish
 Cypselurus oligolepis (Bleeker, 1865) — large-scale flying fish
 Cypselurus opisthopus (Bleeker, 1865) — black-finned flying fish
 Cypselurus poecilopterus (Valenciennes, 1847) - yellow-wing flying fish
 Cypselurus simus (Valenciennes, 1847) — short-nosed flying fish
 Cypselurus starksi (T. Abe, 1953)

See also
 Shakhovskoy, I.B., and N.V. Parin (2019). A review of the flying fish genus Cypselurus (Beloniformes: Exocoetidae). Part 1. Revision of the subgenus Zonocypselurus Parin and Bogorodsky, 2011 with descriptions of one new subgenus, four new species and two new subspecies and reinstatement of one species as valid. Zootaxa 4589(1): 1–71.

References

 
Cypsellurinae
Taxa named by William John Swainson
Marine fish genera